This is a list of known American football players who have played for the Rock Island Independents of the National Football League, from 1920 until 1925, and the first American Football League. It includes players that have played at least one match with the team.

A

B
Dick Barker,
Les Belding,
Joe Bernstein,
Riley Biggs,
Wes Bradshaw,
Lane Bridgeford,
Walt Brindley,
Walt Buland,
Lyle Burton,
Sol Butler

C
Mike Casteel,
Fred Chicken,
Walt Clago,
Jimmy Conzelman,
Fod Cotton,
Frank Coughlin,
Frank Coyle

D
George Dahlgren,
Frank DeClerk,
Fred Denfeld,
Mark Devlin,
Bob Dinsmore,
Eddie Duggan

E
Jug Earp

F
Freeman Fitzgerald

G
Frank Garden,
Buck Gavin,
Bill Giaver,
Alex Gorgal,
Harry Gunderson,
Joe Guyon

H
Harry Hall,
Hal Hanson,
Howard Hartzog,
John Hasbrouck,
Dave Hayes,
Ed Healey,
Dutch Hendrian,
Ed Herman,
Chuck Hill

J
Jim Jacquith,
Jerry Johnson,
Jerry Jones,
Frank Jordan

K
Max Kadesky,
Ave Kaplan,
Emmett Keefe,
Jim Kendrick,
Polly Koch,
Louie Kolls,
Joe Kraker,
Ollie Kraehe,
Waddy Kuehl

L
Roddy Lamb,
Dutch Lauer,
Elmer Layden,
Joe Little Twig,
Charlie Lungren,
Walt Lowe,
Dewey Lyle

M
Grover Malone,
Jerry Mansfield,
Bobby Marshall,
Vince McCarthy,
Bud Menefee,
Charlie Mockmore

N
Sid Nichols,
Marty Norton,
Eddie Novak

P
Bob Phelan

Q
Paddy Quinn

R
Speed Riddell,
Ernest Rohrabaugh,
Joe Rooney

S
Bill Scarpino,
Ned Scott,
Ed Shaw,
Herb Sies,
Duke Slater,
Hank Smith,
Oke Smith,
Dick Stahlman,
Basil Stanley,
Evar Swanson

T
George Thompson,
Fred Thomsen,
Jim Thorpe,
Brick Travis,
Ralph Trout,
Ken Truckenmiller

U
Frank Urban,
Rube Ursella,
Eddie Usher

V
Viv Vanderloo,
Tillie Voss

W
Homer Walker,
Harry Webber,
Ralph Wiedich,
Obe Wenig,
Chet Widerquist,
Mike Wilson,
Guido Wyland,
Pudge Wyman

References

List of All-Time Rock Island Independents Players
Independents 1926 Roster

 
Rock
Rock Island Independents players